In local government, a city hall, town hall, civic centre (in the UK or Australia), guildhall, or a municipal building (in the Philippines), is the chief administrative building of a city, town, or other municipality. It usually houses the city or town council, its associated departments, and their employees. It also usually functions as the base of the mayor of a city, town, borough, county or shire, and of the executive arm of the municipality (if one exists distinctly from the council).

By convention, until the middle of the 19th century, a single large open chamber (or "hall") formed an integral part of the building housing the council. The hall may be used for council meetings and other significant events. This large chamber, the "town hall" (and its later variant "city hall") has become synonymous with the whole building, and with the administrative body housed in it. The terms "council chambers", "municipal building" or variants may be used locally in preference to "town hall" if no such large hall is present within the building.

The local government may endeavor to use the building to promote and enhance the quality of life of the community. In many cases, "town halls" serve not only as buildings for government functions, but also have facilities for various civic and cultural activities. These may include art shows, stage performances, exhibits and festivals. Modern town halls or "civic centres" are often designed with a great variety and flexibility of purpose in mind. In some European countries, the town hall is the venue for the declaration of Christmas Peace, such as Turku and Porvoo in Finland and Tartu in Estonia.

As symbols of local government, city and town halls have distinctive architecture, and the buildings may have great historical significance for example the Guildhall, London. City hall buildings may also serve as cultural icons that symbolize their cities.

Nomenclature 
In Commonwealth countries, the term "town hall" may be used even in a city. This is often the case in the United Kingdom (examples being Manchester Town Hall and Liverpool Town Hall), Australia (Sydney Town Hall), New Zealand, and elsewhere.

People in some regions use the term "city hall" to designate the council offices of a municipality of city status. This is the case in North America, where a distinction is made between city halls and town halls. The term is also sometimes (but more rarely) used as a name in Commonwealth countries: for example, for the City Halls of Brisbane in Australia, and of Cardiff, Norwich and Bristol in the UK. City Hall in Dublin, Ireland, is another example. City Hall in London, opened in 2002, is an exceptional case, being the seat not of a conventional municipal authority, but of a regional strategic authority.

The Oxford English Dictionary sums up the generic terms:

 town hall: "A building used for the administration of local government, the holding of court sessions, public meetings, entertainments, etc.; (in early use also) a large hall used for such purposes within a larger building or set of buildings. ... By metonymy: the government or administration of a town; the town authorities."
 city hall: "(The name of) the chief administrative building or offices of a municipal government. ... Originally and chiefly North American. Municipal officers collectively; city government."

County Council administrations in parts of England and Wales generally operate from a base in a building called, by analogy, a "county hall" or "shire hall". Conversely, cities that have subdivisions with their own councils may have borough halls. Scottish local government in larger cities operates from the "City Chambers", otherwise the "Town House".

Other names are occasionally used. The administrative headquarters of the City of London retains its Anglo-Saxon name, the Guildhall, signifying a place where taxes were paid. In a few English cities (including Birmingham, Coventry and Nottingham) the preferred term is "Council House": this was also true in Bristol until 2012, when the building was renamed "City Hall". In Birmingham, there is a distinction between the Council House and the Town Hall, a concert and meeting venue which pre-dates it. In Sheffield, the distinction is between the Town Hall, the seat of local government, and the City Hall, a concert and ballroom venue. In Leeds, the Town Hall, built in the 1850s as a seat of local government, now functions primarily as a concert, conference, and wedding venue, many of its municipal functions having moved in 1933 to the new Civic Hall.

History 
Large halls called basilicas were used in ancient Rome for the administration of justice, as meeting places, and for trade.

In the Early Middle Ages, the great hall, a single large open chamber, was the main, and sometimes only room of the home of a feudal lord. There the lord lived with his family and retinue, ate, slept, and administered rule and justice. Activities in the hall played an essential role in the functioning of the feudal manor, the administrative unit of society. As manorial dwellings developed into manor houses, castles, and palaces, the great hall remained an essential unit within the architectural complex.

In the later Middle Ages or early modern period, many European market towns erected communal market halls, comprising a covered space to function as a marketplace at street level, and one or more rooms used for public or civic purposes above it. These buildings were frequently the precursors of dedicated town halls.

The modern concept of the town hall developed with the rise of local or regional government. Cities administered by a group of elected or chosen representatives, rather than by a lord or princely ruler, required a place for them to meet. The Cologne City Hall of 1135 is a prominent example of the municipal autonomy of medieval cities. The Palazzo Pubblico of the Republic of Siena and the Palazzo Vecchio of the Republic of Florence, both town halls, date from 1297 and 1299 respectively. In each case, the large, fortified building comprises a large meeting hall and numerous administrative chambers. Both buildings are topped by very tall towers, have ancient clocks by which the townsfolk can regulate their lives, and have storerooms for muniments. These features became standard for town halls across Europe. The 15th-century Brussels Town Hall, with its  tower, is one of the grandest examples of the medieval era, serving as a model for 19th-century town halls such as the Rathaus, Vienna.

During the 19th century, town halls often included reading rooms to provide free education to the public, and it later became customary for the council to establish and maintain a public library. The grand chamber or meeting place, the "town hall" itself, became a place for receptions, banquets, balls, and public entertainment. Town halls were often equipped with large pipe organs to facilitate public recitals.

In the 20th century, town halls have served the public as places for voting, examinations, vaccinations, relief in times of disaster, and for posting lists of war casualties, as well as for the more usual civil functions, festivities, and entertainments. Local councils have increasingly tended to move administrative functions into modern offices. Where new premises are designed and constructed to house local governments, the functions of an administrative office and of a civic town hall have become separated.

Language 
Particularly in North America, "city hall" can be used as a metonym to mean municipal government, or government in general, as in the axiom "You can't fight city hall". "Town hall" tends to have less formal connotations (cf. Town meeting).

See also 
 List of city and town halls
 Barangay hall
 Market hall
 Moot hall
 Town meeting
 Administrative centre

References

Further reading
 
 
 

 
Local government